Clux-Villeneuve is a commune in the Saône-et-Loire department in the region of Bourgogne-Franche-Comté in eastern France. It is the result of the merger, on 1 January 2015, of the communes of Clux and La Villeneuve.

See also
Communes of the Saône-et-Loire department

References

Communes of Saône-et-Loire